Eliezer Schweid (7 September 1929 – 18 January 2022) was an Israeli scholar, writer and Professor of Jewish Philosophy at The Hebrew University of Jerusalem. He was also a fellow of the Jerusalem Center for Public Affairs. Schweid died on 18 January 2022, at the age of 92.

Awards 
In 1994, Schweid was awarded the Israel Prize, in Jewish thought.

Published works
 Jewish Identity in Modern Israel: Proceedings on Secular Judaism and Democracy
 The Jewish Experience of Time (2000)
 Wrestling Until Day-Break: Searching for Meaning in the Thinking on the Holocaust (1994)
 Democracy and Halakhah (1994)
 Siddur HaTefilla (2009)
 The Land of Israel: National Home Or Land of Destiny (1985, with Deborah Greniman)
 Judaism and Mysticism According to Gershom Scholem: A Critical Analysis and Programmatic Discussion (1985)
 The Classic Jewish Philosophers: From Saadia Through the Renaissance (Supplements to the Journal of Jewish Thought and Philosophy) (2008, Leonard Levin)

References

See also 
List of Israel Prize recipients

1929 births
2022 deaths
Academic staff of the Hebrew University of Jerusalem
Israeli Jews
Israel Prize in Jewish thought recipients
Jewish mysticism